Metamorphosis is a novella written by Franz Kafka which was first published in 1915. One of Kafka's best-known works, Metamorphosis tells the story of salesman Gregor Samsa, who wakes one morning to find himself inexplicably transformed into a huge insect ("monstrous vermin") and subsequently struggles to adjust to this new condition. The novella has been widely discussed among literary critics, with differing interpretations being offered. In popular culture and adaptations of the novella, the insect is commonly depicted as a cockroach. 

With a length of about 70 printed pages, it is the longest of the stories Kafka considered complete and published during his lifetime. The text was first published in 1915 in the October issue of the journal Die weißen Blätter under the editorship of René Schickele. The first edition in book form appeared in December 1915 in the series Der jüngste Tag, edited by Kurt Wolff.

Plot
Gregor Samsa wakes up one morning to find himself transformed into a "monstrous vermin". He initially considers the transformation to be temporary and slowly ponders the consequences of this metamorphosis. Stuck on his back and unable to get up and leave the bed, Gregor reflects on his job as a traveling salesman and cloth merchant, which he characterizes as being full of "temporary and constantly changing human relationships, which never come from the heart". He sees his employer as a despot and would quickly quit his job if he were not his family's sole breadwinner and working off his bankrupt father's debts. While trying to move, Gregor finds that his office manager, the chief clerk, has shown up to check on him, indignant about Gregor's unexcused absence. Gregor attempts to communicate with both the manager and his family, but all they can hear from behind the door is incomprehensible vocalizations. Gregor laboriously drags himself across the floor and opens the door. The clerk, upon seeing the transformed Gregor, flees the apartment. Gregor's family is horrified, and his father drives him back into his room, injuring his side by shoving him when he gets stuck in the doorway.

With Gregor's unexpected transformation, his family is deprived of financial stability. They keep Gregor locked in his room, and he begins to accept his new identity and adapt to his new body. His sister Grete is the only one willing to bring him food, which they find Gregor only likes if it is rotten. He spends much of his time crawling around on the floor, walls, and ceiling and, upon discovering Gregor's new pastime, Grete decides to remove his furniture to give him more space. She and her mother begin to empty the room of everything, except the sofa under which Gregor hides whenever anyone comes in, but he finds their actions deeply distressing in fear that he might forget his past, while he still was a human, and desperately tries to save a particularly loved portrait on the wall of a woman clad in fur. His mother loses consciousness at the sight of him clinging to the image to protect it. When Grete rushes out of the room to get some aromatic spirits, Gregor follows her and is slightly hurt when she drops a medicine bottle and it breaks. Their father returns home and angrily hurls apples at Gregor, one of which becomes lodged in a sensitive spot in his back and severely wounds him.

Gregor suffers from his injuries for the rest of his life and takes very little food. His father, mother, and sister all get jobs and increasingly begin to neglect him, and his room begins to be used for storage. For a time, his family leaves Gregor's door open in the evenings so he can listen to them talk to each other, but this happens less frequently once they rent a room in the apartment to three male tenants, since they are not told about Gregor. One day the charwoman, who briefly looks in on Gregor each day when she arrives and before she leaves, neglects to close his door fully. Attracted by Grete's violin-playing in the living room, Gregor crawls out and is spotted by the unsuspecting tenants, who complain about the apartment's unhygienic conditions and say they are leaving, will not pay anything for the time they have already stayed, and may take legal action. Grete, who has tired of taking care of Gregor and realizes the burden his existence puts on each member of the family, tells her parents they must get rid of "it" or they will all be ruined. Gregor, understanding that he is no longer wanted, laboriously makes his way back to his room and dies of starvation before sunrise. His body is discovered by the charwoman, who alerts his family and then disposes of the corpse. The relieved and optimistic father, mother, and sister all take the day off work. They travel by tram into the countryside and make plans to move to a smaller apartment to save money. During the short trip, Mr. and Mrs. Samsa realize that, despite the hardships that have brought some paleness to her face, Grete has grown up into a pretty young lady with a good figure and they think about finding her a husband.

Characters

Gregor Samsa

Gregor is the main character of the story. He works as a traveling salesman in order to provide money for his sister and parents. He wakes up one morning finding himself transformed into an insect. After the metamorphosis, Gregor becomes unable to work and is confined to his room for most of the remainder of the story. This prompts his family to begin working once again. Gregor is depicted as isolated from society and often both misunderstands the true intentions of others and is misunderstood.

The name "Gregor Samsa" appears to derive partly from literary works Kafka had read. A character in The Story of Young Renate Fuchs, by German novelist Jakob Wassermann (1873–1934), is named Gregor Samassa. The Viennese author Leopold von Sacher-Masoch, whose sexual imagination gave rise to the idea of masochism, is also an influence. Sacher-Masoch wrote Venus in Furs (1870), a novel whose hero assumes the name Gregor at one point. A "Venus in furs" recurs in The Metamorphosis in the picture that Gregor Samsa has hung on his bedroom wall.

Grete Samsa
Grete is Gregor's younger sister, and she becomes his caretaker after his metamorphosis. They initially have a close relationship, but this quickly fades. At first, she volunteers to feed him and clean his room, but she grows increasingly impatient with the burden and begins to leave his room in disarray out of spite. Her initial decision to take care of Gregor may have come from a desire to contribute and be useful to the family, since she becomes angry and upset when the mother cleans his room. It is made clear that Grete is disgusted by Gregor, as she always opens the window upon entering his room to keep from feeling nauseous and leaves without doing anything if Gregor is in plain sight. She plays the violin and dreams of going to the conservatory to study, a dream Gregor had intended to make happen; he had planned on making the announcement on Christmas Day. To help provide an income for the family after Gregor's transformation, she starts working as a salesgirl. Grete is also the first to suggest getting rid of Gregor, which causes Gregor to plan his own death. At the end of the story, Grete's parents realize that she has become beautiful and full-figured and decide to consider finding her a husband.

Mr Samsa
Mr Samsa is Gregor's father. After the metamorphosis, he is forced to return to work in order to support the family financially. His attitude towards his son is harsh. He regards the transformed Gregor with disgust and possibly even fear and attacks Gregor on several occasions. Even when Gregor was human, Mr Samsa regarded him mostly as a source of income for the family. Gregor's relationship with his father is modelled after Kafka's own relationship with his father. The theme of alienation becomes quite evident here.

Mrs Samsa
Mrs Samsa is Gregor's mother. She is portrayed as a submissive wife. She suffers from asthma, which is a constant source of concern for Gregor. She is initially shocked at Gregor's transformation, but she still wants to enter his room. However, it proves too much for her and gives rise to a conflict between her maternal impulse and sympathy and her fear and revulsion at Gregor's new form.

The Charwoman
The charwoman is an old widowed lady who is employed by the Samsa family after their previous maid begs to be dismissed on account of the fright she experiences owing to Gregor's new form. She is paid to take care of their household duties. Apart from Grete and her father, the charwoman is the only person who is in close contact with Gregor, and she is unafraid in her dealings with Gregor. She does not question his changed state; she seemingly accepts it as a normal part of his existence. She is the one who notices Gregor has died and disposes of his body.

Interpretation 
Like most of Kafka's works, Metamorphosis tends to be given a religious (Max Brod) or psychological interpretation by most of its interpreters. It has been particularly common to read the story as an expression of Kafka's father complex, as was first done by Charles Neider in his The Frozen Sea: A Study of Franz Kafka (1948). Besides the psychological approach, interpretations focusing on sociological aspects, which see the Samsa family as a portrayal of general social circumstances, have also gained a large following.

Vladimir Nabokov rejected such interpretations, noting that they do not live up to Kafka's art. He instead chose an interpretation guided by the artistic detail, but categorically excluded any attempts at deciphering a symbolic or allegoric level of meaning. Arguing against the popular father-complex theory, he observed that it is the sister more than the father who should be considered the cruelest person in the story, since she is the one backstabbing Gregor. In Nabokov's view, the central narrative theme is the artist's struggle for existence in a society replete with philistines that destroys him step by step. Commenting on Kafka's style he writes "The transparency of his style underlines the dark richness of his fantasy world. Contrast and uniformity, style and the depicted, portrayal and fable are seamlessly intertwined".

In 1989, Nina Pelikan Straus wrote a feminist interpretation of Metamorphosis, bringing to the forefront the transformation of the main character, Gregor's sister, Grete, and foregrounding the family and, particularly, the younger sister's transformation in the story. According to Straus, critics of Metamorphosis have underplayed the fact that the story is not only about Gregor but also about his family and especially about Grete's metamorphosis since it is mainly Grete, as woman, daughter and sister, on whom the social and psychoanalytic resonances of the text depend.

In 1999, Gerhard Rieck pointed out that Gregor and his sister, Grete, form a pair, which is typical of many of Kafka's texts: it is made up of one passive, rather austere, person and another active, more libidinal, person. The appearance of figures with such almost irreconcilable personalities who form couples in Kafka's works has been evident since he wrote his short story "Description of a Struggle" (e.g. the narrator/young man and his "acquaintance"). They also appear in "The Judgment" (Georg and his friend in Russia), in all three of his novels (e.g. Robinson and Delamarche in Amerika) as well as in his short stories "A Country Doctor" (the country doctor and the groom) and "A Hunger Artist" (the hunger artist and the panther). Rieck views these pairs as parts of one single person (hence the similarity between the names Gregor and Grete) and in the final analysis as the two determining components of the author's personality. Not only in Kafka's life but also in his oeuvre does Rieck see the description of a fight between these two parts.

Reiner Stach argued in 2004 that no elucidating comments were needed to illustrate the story and that it was convincing by itself, self-contained, even absolute. He believes that there is no doubt the story would have been admitted to the canon of world literature even if we had known nothing about its author.

According to Peter-André Alt (2005), the figure of the beetle becomes a drastic expression of Gregor Samsa's deprived existence. Reduced to carrying out his professional responsibilities, anxious to guarantee his advancement and vexed with the fear of making commercial mistakes, he is the creature of a functionalistic professional life.

In 2007, Ralf Sudau took the view that particular attention should be paid to the motifs of self-abnegation and disregard for reality. Gregor's earlier behavior was characterized by self-renunciation and his pride in being able to provide a secure and leisured existence for his family. When he finds himself in a situation where he himself is in need of attention and assistance and in danger of becoming a parasite, he doesn't want to admit this new role to himself and be disappointed by the treatment he receives from his family, which is becoming more and more careless and even hostile over time. According to Sudau, Gregor is self-denyingly hiding his nauseating appearance under the sofa and gradually famishing, thus pretty much complying with the more or less blatant wish of his family. His gradual emaciation and "self-reduction" shows signs of a fatal hunger strike (which on the part of Gregor is unconscious and unsuccessful, on the part of his family not understood or ignored).  Sudau also lists the names of selected interpreters of The Metamorphosis (e.g. Beicken, Sokel, Sautermeister and Schwarz). According to them, the narrative is a metaphor for the suffering resulting from leprosy, an escape into the disease or a symptom onset, an image of an existence which is defaced by the career, or a revealing staging which cracks the veneer and superficiality of everyday circumstances and exposes its cruel essence. He further notes that Kafka's representational style is on one hand characterized by an idiosyncratic interpenetration of realism and fantasy, a worldly mind, rationality, and clarity of observation, and on the other hand by folly, outlandishness, and fallacy. He also points to the grotesque and tragicomical, silent film-like elements.

Fernando Bermejo-Rubio (2012) argued that the story is often viewed unjustly as inconclusive. He derives his interpretative approach from the fact that the descriptions of Gregor and his family environment in The Metamorphosis contradict each other. Diametrically opposed versions exist of Gregor's back, his voice, of whether he is ill or already undergoing the metamorphosis, whether he is dreaming or not, which treatment he deserves, of his moral point of view (false accusations made by Grete), and whether his family is blameless or not. Bermejo-Rubio emphasizes that Kafka ordered in 1915 that there should be no illustration of Gregor. He argues that it is exactly this absence of a visual narrator that is essential for Kafka's project, for he who depicts Gregor would stylize himself as an omniscient narrator. Another reason why Kafka opposed such an illustration is that the reader should not be biased in any way before reading. That the descriptions are not compatible with each other is indicative of the fact that the opening statement is not to be trusted. If the reader isn't hoodwinked by the first sentence and still thinks of Gregor as a human being, he will view the story as conclusive and realize that Gregor is a victim of his own degeneration.

Volker Drüke (2013) believes that the crucial metamorphosis in the story is that of Grete. She is the character the title is directed at. Gregor's metamorphosis is followed by him languishing and ultimately dying. Grete, by contrast, has matured as a result of the new family circumstances and assumed responsibility. In the end – after the brother's death – the parents also notice that their daughter, "who was getting more animated all the time, [...] had recently blossomed into a pretty and shapely girl", and want to look for a partner for her. From this standpoint Grete's transition, her metamorphosis from a girl into a woman, is the subtextual theme of the story.

Translation of the opening sentence 
Translators of the novel into English have given widely different texts, including of the opening sentence, which in the original is "". In the first 1933 translation of the story, Willa Muir rendered it as "As Gregor Samsa awoke one morning from uneasy dreams he found himself transformed in his bed into a gigantic insect".

The phrase "ungeheuren Ungeziefer" in particular has been rendered in many different ways by translators. These include
 "gigantic insect" (Muir, 1948)
 "monstrous vermin" (Corngold, 1972, Neugroschel, 1993/1995, Freed, 1996)
 "giant bug" (Underwood, 1981)
 "monstrous insect" (Pasley, 1992)
 "enormous bug" (Appelbaum, 1996)
 "gargantuan pest" (Roberts, 2005)
 "monstrous cockroach" (Hofmann, 2007)
 "horrible vermin" (Wyllie, 2009)
 "large verminous insect" (Williams, 2011)
 "some sort of monstrous insect" (Bernofsky, 2014)
 "monstrous verminous bug" (Johnson, 2015)

In Middle High German, Ungeziefer literally means "unclean animal not suitable for sacrifice" and is sometimes used colloquially to mean "bug", with the gist of "dirty, nasty bug". It can also be translated as "vermin". English translators of The Metamorphosis  have often rendered it as "insect".

What kind of bug or vermin Kafka envisaged remains a debated mystery. Kafka had no intention of labeling Gregor as any specific thing, but instead was trying to convey Gregor's disgust at his transformation. In his letter to his publisher of 25 October 1915, in which he discusses his concern about the cover illustration for the first edition, Kafka does use the term Insekt, though, saying "The insect itself is not to be drawn. It is not even to be seen from a distance."

Vladimir Nabokov, who was a lepidopterist as well as a writer and literary critic, concluded from details in the text that Gregor was not a cockroach, but a beetle with wings under his shell, and capable of flight. Nabokov left a sketch annotated "just over three feet long" on the opening page of his English teaching copy. In his accompanying lecture notes, he discusses the type of insect Gregor has been transformed into. Noting that the cleaning lady addressed Gregor as "dung beetle" (Mistkäfer), e.g., 'Come here for a bit, old dung beetle!’ or 'Hey, look at the old dung beetle!’", Nabokov remarks that this was just her way of friendly addressing and that Gregor "is not, technically, a dung beetle. He is merely a big beetle."

In popular culture

References

External links

Online editions
 Die Verwandlung  at DigBib.org (text, pdf, HTML) 
 The Metamorphosis , translated 2009 by Ian Johnston of Malaspina University-College, Nanaimo, BC
 The Metamorphosis at The Kafka project, translated by Ian Johnston released to public domain
 The Metamorphosis - Annotated text aligned to Common Core Standards
 , translated by David Wyllie
 
 Lecture on The Metamorphosis by Vladimir Nabokov

Commentary
 Lesson on the difficulties of translating the story into English 

Related
 Metamorphosis: The Game by Mito Studio, based on the story by Franz Kafka. 

1915 German-language novels
Fiction about shapeshifting
Existentialist novels
Short stories by Franz Kafka
Modernist novels
German novellas
Absurdist fiction
Fictional cockroaches
German novels adapted into films
Short stories adapted into films
1915 German novels
Weird fiction novels